American School of Tripoli (AST) is an American international school in Tripoli, Libya. It serves grades Pre-Kindergarten through 12.

History
The school opened on September 18, 2005, with only 2 students. As of 2010 the school had 155 students. The school temporarily closed in 2012 due to the Libyan Crisis and the First Libyan Civil War; it had plans to reopen in 2013.

References

Tripoli
International schools in Tripoli, Libya
2005 establishments in Libya
Educational institutions established in 2005
Elementary and primary schools in Libya
High schools and secondary schools in Libya
Libya